Elpidio Valdés is a cartoon character and comic, who starred in a number of features, shorts and strips of the same name. He was created in 1970 by cartoonist and Cuban filmmaker Juan Padrón, considered the father of Cuban film animation and director of the first three animated feature films produced by the Cuban Institute of Cinematographic Art and Industry.

Elpidio Valdes is a mambí colonel fighting for the liberation of their homeland from Spanish colonialism, commanding a squadron of cavalry, and represents the Cuban peasants in the 19th century slaves joined, and some landowners to form the Army of liberation.

He owes his name to Cecilia Valdés, Cuban protagonist of a novel of the 19th century.

Elpidio Valdes was intended to strengthen among Cuban children and youth a particular state view of an alleged authentic expression of the characters of the Cuban nationality.

Plot 

Elpidio Valdés was born in the 1870s, in a field of battle during the Ten Years' War. He was son of a rebel army officer and a peasant woman. In 1895, he joined the Liberation Army in the beginning of the War of Independence. His father caught in an ambush at the beginning of the war, in which his mother continued to work in exile. Reach the rank of colonel and survives the end of the war and during the Republic. He married in full battle with his girlfriend Maria Silvia with whom he has a son.

The character's story is told in three films.

Characters 

The following characters accompany Elpidio in his adventures.

 Maria Silvia, his girlfriend and (later) wife.
 Palmiche, his horse several shades of brown and orange.
 Commander Marcial, his assistant. He died in combat in 1898.
 General Resóplez, their greatest enemy.
 Colonel Andaluz, Resoplez assistant.
 Colonel Cetáceo, Resóplez nephew.
 Pepito, child soldier mambí.
 Eutelia, girl and assistant Maria Silvia.
 Mister Chains, American landowner.
 Media Cara, captain of the counterinsurgency.
 Oliverio, inventor of the troops.
 General Pérez, head of Elpidio.
 Cortico, Media Cara counterguerrilla.

Production 

The creator, writer and senior editor of the series is Juan Padrón. They have also participated as directors Tulio Raggi, Mario Rivas and Juan Ruiz.

The theme song from the original series Ballad of Elpidio is composed and performed by Silvio Rodríguez about the music of Lucas de la Guardia. The theme of the second film and the second and third series of short films is Daniel Longrés.

Cuban actor Frank Gonzalez voiced Elpidio and several other characters. Other voices were provided by Tony Gonzalez, Manuel Marin, Eddy Vidal, Maria Eugenia Garcia, Irela Bravo, Juan Julio Alfonso, Teresita Rúa and Erdwin Fernández.

Movies and TV series 

 Elpidio Valdés (1979). Has the birth of Elpidio, his father's death and the beginning of the War of Independence, and know Maria Silvia and dome becomes a scourge to the Spanish army, the U.S. counter-guerrilla and landowners. It takes place almost entirely in 1895.
 Elpidio Valdés contra Dólar y Cañón (1983). Elpidio account the efforts of Cuba to carry a cargo of arms from the United States. It takes place between 1896 and 1897.
 Elpidio Valdés contra el águila y el león (1995). The adventures of Elpidio during the American intervention in the War of Independence. This film is formatted between fiction and documentary animation.
 Más se perdió en Cuba. Extended version of the film Elpidio Valdés contra el águla y el león into 5 chapters.

Short cartoons

1970s 

 Elpidio Valdés contra el tren militar (1974)
 Una aventura de Elpidio Valdés (1974)
 El machete (1975)
 Clarín mambí (1976)
 Elpidio Valdés asalta el convoy (1976)
 Elpidio Valdés contra la policía de Nueva York (1976)
 Elpidio Valdés está rodeado (1977)
 Elpidio Valdés encuentra a Palmiche (1977)
 Elpidio Valdés contra los rayadillos (1978)
 Elpidio Valdés fuerza la trocha (1978)
 Elpidio Valdés y el fusil (1979)

1980s 

 Elpidio Valdés contra la cañonera (1980)
 Elpidio Valdés en campaña de verano (1988)
 Elpidio Valdés ¡Capturado! (1988)
 Elpidio Valdés ataca a Jutía Dulce (1988)
 Elpidio Valdés y el 5to de cazadores (1988)
 Elpidio Valdés y Palmiche contra los lanceros (1989)
 Elpidio Valdés y la abuelita de Weyler (1989)

1990s and 2000s 

 Elpidio Valdés se casa (1991)
 Elpidio Valdés conoce a Fito (1992)
 Elpidio Valdés y los inventores (1992)
 Elpidio Valdés contra el fortín de hierro (2000)
 Elpidio Valdés se enfrenta a Resóplez (2000)
 Pepe descubre la rueda (2002)
 Elpidio Valdés ataca trancalapuerta (2003)

Print Edition 
The comic strip appeared in 1970 in the Pionero magazine and during  the 1980s was published monthly in the magazine Zunzún.

Animated series
Cuban animation
Cuban comics
1970 comics debuts
Valdes
Valdes
Historical comics
Adventure comics
War comics
Humor comics
Comics set in the 19th century
Valdes
Valdes
Comics set in Cuba